Ugi may refer to:

Ugi reaction, in chemistriy
UGI Corporation, an American energy company
Ugi Island in the Solomon Islands
Camillo Ugi (1884–1970), German footballer
Ivar Karl Ugi (1930–2005), German chemist

See also 
 Uggi (disambiguation)
 Ugie (disambiguation)